Webster City is a city in Hamilton County, Iowa, United States. The population was 7,825 at the 2020 census. It is the county seat of Hamilton County. Webster City is known as 'Boone River Country', as the Boone River meanders along the east side of the city.

History 

Webster City was originally called Newcastle by settlers of European descent. Under the latter name it was changed in 1854 by Wilson Brewer.  In 1855, Walter C. Willson came to Newcastle.

Willson was elected to the Iowa State House the next year and, with John F. Duncombe, crafted a bill to divide the very large Webster County in half. Newcastle would be renamed "Webster City," named after Daniel Webster of Massachusetts and would become the county seat of the new county. Willson suggested "Hamilton County" after William W. Hamilton, the president of the State Senate. He helped pass the legislation. The law took effect on January 1, 1857, renaming Webster City and designating it as the county seat of the newly organized Hamilton County. Willson was also instrumental in getting the Dubuque & Sioux City rail line to be constructed through Webster City on its way to Fort Dodge. He personally oversaw the laying of track.

Geography 

Webster City is located at  (42.466300, -93.820582).

Climate

According to the Köppen Climate Classification system, Webster City has a hot-summer humid continental climate, abbreviated "Dfa" on climate maps.

Demographics

2010 census

As of the census of 2010, there were 8,070 people, 3,433 households, and 2,096 families residing in the city. The racial makeup of the city was 90.8% White, 0.4% African American, 0.2% Native American, 3.4% Asian, 3.5% from other races, and 1.7% from two or more races. Hispanic or Latino of any race were 7.4% of the population.

There were 3,433 households, out of which 29.2% had children under the age of 18 living with them, 46.2% were married couples living together, 10.3% had a female householder with no husband present, 4.5% had a male householder with no wife present, and 38.9% were non-families. 33.5% of all households were made up of individuals, and 15.4% had someone living alone who was 65 years of age or older. The average household size was 2.31 and the average family size was 2.93.

The median age in the city was 40.2 years. 24.5% of residents were under the age of 18; 7.6% were between the ages of 18 and 24; 23.5% were from 25 to 44; 25.1% were from 45 to 64; and 19.3% were 65 years of age or older. The gender makeup of the city was 48.5% male and 51.5% female.

2000 census 

As of the census of 2000, there were 8,176 people, 3,502 households, and 2,227 families residing in the city. The racial makeup of the city was 95.41% White, 0.33% African American, 0.26% Native American, 2.45% Asian, 0.01% Pacific Islander, 0.48% from other races, and 1.06% from two or more races. Hispanic or Latino of any race were 1.32% of the population.

There were 3,502 households, out of which 28.4% had children under the age of 18 living with them, 50.5% were married couples living together, 9.5% had a female householder with no husband present, and 36.4% were non-families. 32.0% of all households were made up of individuals, and 15.3% had someone living alone who was 65 years of age or older. The average household size was 2.30 and the average family size was 2.89.

Age spread: 24.1% under the age of 18, 8.1% from 18 to 24, 26.7% from 25 to 44, 21.4% from 45 to 64, and 19.7% who were 65 years of age or older. The median age was 39 years. For every 100 females, there were 92.4 males. For every 100 females age 18 and over, there were 90.8 males.

The median income for a household in the city was $36,582, and the median income for a family was $44,342. Males had a median income of $30,404 versus $23,163 for females. The per capita income for the city was $19,057. About 5.2% of families and 7.3% of the population were below the poverty line, including 10.6% of those under age 18 and 5.6% of those age 65 or over.

Business and industry 
Webster City is the headquarters of several companies, including Vantec,Van Diest Supply Company, Mary Ann's Specialty Foods, Webster City Custom Meats, and Tasler. Webster City's top industries are advanced manufacturing, plastics manufacturing, food processing, agricultural related products, and warehousing and distribution.

Since 2010, Webster City has attracted new projects and business expansions, including the Van Diest Medical Center, a $35 million critical access hospital; a $13 million competition gym at the high school; a new Casey's General Store; a HARIDES transit facility; and expansions by Cropland Containers, Mary Ann's Specialty Foods, Dollar General, HyVee, and Fareway.

Education
Public education in Webster City is provided by Webster City Community School District, with Webster City High School, Webster City Middle School, and Pleasant View or Sunset Heights for elementary education. A private Catholic school at St. Thomas Aquinas Catholic Church offers a preschool through 6th grade elementary education.

Transportation 

U.S. Route 20, a four-lane east-west corridor through north central Iowa, was built along Webster City. Approximately 12 miles east is Interstate 35. The city has a municipal airport with a  runway and full-time Fixed-base operator. A junction of lines of the Canadian National and Union Pacific Railroads is located in Webster City. There is no Uber in the community.

Recreation 

Webster City has eleven parks, two golf courses, indoor and outdoor community swimming pools, a recreation center, more than seven miles of walking trails, and many camping areas:

  Kendall Young Park, along the Boone River, has 4 shelter houses, 6 picnic areas, a baseball diamond, 2 shuffle board courts, a volleyball court, horseshoe pit, playground, walking trail and fishing area.
  Twin Parks, located in downtown Webster City, features a new shelter house, picnic tables, modern playground, sun shelter, and a skatepark.
  Nokomis Park features a canoe access point.
  Middleton Sports Complex has 2 softball fields and an ice rink.
  Lions Park includes a play area, picnic area and basketball court.
  Riverside Park is located off East Second Street.
  Brewer Creek Park is open year-round and includes a shelter house with picnic tables along Brewer Creek.  Brewer Creek is home to a 2.2-mile nature/walking trail, volleyball court and nine-hole disc golf course.  In the winter "Hospital Hill" is a popular public sledding location.
  Sketchly Park features a picnic area and playground.
  E.V. Wehrhelm Park is a neighborhood park with play equipment and a shelter.
  Boone River Recreational Trail is a 5.7-mile trail from the Webster City Links Golf Course in the north part of the city limits to Briggs Woods Park in the south of the city limits.  The trail winds along the Boone River and features a 10-foot-wide concrete pathway for biking, walking, running, and rollerblading.
Briggs Woods Park is a 550-acre park with an 18-hole golf course, 81 campsites, 3 shelters, 4 cabins and a 62-acre lake for fishing, boating and swimming.
  Webster City Municipal Swimming Pool is an outdoor swimming pool with a zero-depth entry, 25-meter lap lanes, a diving well with high and low diving boards, and a waterslide.
 Fuller Hall Recreation Center is partially endowed and managed by the Fuller Hall Trust. It features activities for adults, children, and families, including a swimming pool with 25-meter lap lanes, a fitness room, a game room with pool tables, television lounge, basketball court, locker rooms, two racquetball courts, and a remodeled conference facility.
  Briggs Woods Golf Course is a public 18-hole golf course located south of town.
  The Webster City Links Golf Course is a nine-hole public course situated along the Boone River. It was formerly the private Webster City Country Club.

Events and activities 

Webster City is home to the Hamilton County Fairgrounds, which holds the county fair every July. In addition, the fairgrounds is home to the Historic Hamilton County Speedway.

Webster City's annual community celebration is the Boone Bash River Dash, which features a cardboard regatta.  It is held every June.

Media 

The local radio stations are KZWC and KQWC-FM. The Daily Freeman Journal is the city's local newspaper and is published Monday through Friday.

Notable people 
 Jeremy Ferguson (Jinxx), Black Veil Brides' rhythm guitarist and violinist
 John Gregory, football coach and player
 Asher Howard, lawyer and Minnesota state legislator
 MacKinlay Kantor, writer and 1956 Pulitzer Prize winner for fiction for his novel Andersonville
 Chuck Lamson, professional football player
 Clark R. Mollenhoff, journalist and 1958 Pulitzer Prize winner for journalism in the category of National Reporting (Des Moines Register and Tribune).
 Carla Nelson, Minnesota state Senator, candidate for United States House of Representatives in 2018
 Rod Rust, football coach
 Jennifer Simpson, distance runner, medalist at Olympics and World Championships
 Abastenia St. Leger Eberle, sculptor

References

External links 

 City website
 Freeman Journal newspaper
 Webster City Tourism website
 Webster City Economic Development

Cities in Iowa
Cities in Hamilton County, Iowa
County seats in Iowa